Alice Forgy Kerr (born August 30, 1954) is an American politician who served in the Kentucky Senate from the 12th district from 1999 to 2023.

References

1954 births
Living people
Republican Party Kentucky state senators
Women state legislators in Kentucky
21st-century American politicians
21st-century American women politicians